Tsurugizan Taniemon (劔山 谷右衛門, 1803 – October 17, 1854) was a sumo wrestler from Toyama City, Japan. His highest rank was ōzeki. He won six tournament championships on an unofficial basis, before the yūshō system was established and was offered, but rejected, a yokozuna licence.

Career
He joined Hatachiyama stable and was later trained under yokozuna Ōnomatsu Midorinosuke. At first he fought under the ring name Waniishi. He was one of few wrestlers to defeat yokozuna Inazuma Raigorō, who held a winning percentage of 90.9. After he won all bouts as sekiwake in the November 1841 tournament, he was promoted to ōzeki in February 1842. He was to have the best individual record in six tournaments, equivalent to six yūshō today, and recorded 29 consecutive wins. He changed his techniques according to the circumstances. He was granted a yokozuna licence but rejected this and nominated Hidenoyama Raigorō instead. He held the ōzeki rank for 11 years, but he finally retired as an active wrestler in February 1852 shortly before the age of 50. He is said to have died on October 17, 1854, but his death date remains vague.

Top division record 
The actual time the tournaments were held during the year in this period often varied.
 
 
    
    
  
 
    
    
  

    
    
  

    
    
  

    
    
  

    
    
  

    
    
  

    
    
  

    
    
  

    
    
  

    
    
  

    
    
  

    
    
  

    
    
  

    
    
  

    
    
  

    
    
  

    
    
  

    
  

*Championships for the best record in a tournament were not recognized or awarded before the 1909 summer tournament and the above unofficial championships are historically conferred. For more information see yūshō.

See also
Glossary of sumo terms
List of past sumo wrestlers

References

External links
Tournament results

1803 births
1854 deaths
Japanese sumo wrestlers
Ōzeki
People from Toyama (city)
Sumo people from Toyama Prefecture